S.O.S.: Stories of Survival is a Philippine reality-documentary public service television program that is hosted by Martin Andanar and aired on ABC-5 (now known as TV5) from November 3, 2005 until 2008.

Premise
The show features stories of natural disasters and survival tips for natural disasters.

See also
 Anatomy of a Disaster - A similar show on GMA Network from 2010 until 2011.
 Hamon ng Kalikasan - A similar show on GMA News TV in 2012.

References

2005 Philippine television series debuts
2008 Philippine television series endings
Philippine reality television series
TV5 (Philippine TV network) original programming
Philippine documentary television series
Filipino-language television shows
Documentary films about natural disasters
News5 shows